Leopoldia gussonei is a plant in the family Asparagaceae, endemic to the Island of Sicily.

In 1992, under the synonym Muscari gussonei, it was designated as a 'priority species' under Annex II of the Habitats Directive in the European Union, which means areas in which it occurs can be declared Special Areas of Conservation, if these areas belong to one of the number of habitats listed in Annex I of the directive.

References

Scilloideae
Flora of Sicily